De RigueurMortis (stylised as De RigueurMortis) is the fifth studio album by Australian alternative-rock group TISM, released in October 2001. The album peaked at number 24 on the ARIA Charts.

The title is taken from a line in the song "Come Back DJ, Your Record is Scratched". The album cover is a tribute to the fantasy-themed artwork of Roger Dean, famous for his work with art rock bands such as Yes.

Initial copies of this release, dubbed the Connoisseur's Edition, included several untitled tracks and a bonus CD titled 2Pot Screama, a 40-minute "rock opera in one act" which TISM described as "West Side Story with Tourette's syndrome".

The censored name in the final track, 'BFW', is Kylie Minogue. At the time of the album's release, both TISM and Kylie Minogue were label mates on Festival Mushroom Records. The track was censored at the record company's insistence.

Reception

Track listing

2Pot Screama

Charts

Release history

References

2001 albums
TISM albums
Rock operas